Wildwood is a home rule-class city in Jefferson County, Kentucky, United States. The population was 261 at the 2010 census.

Geography
It is bordered to the west by Lyndon and otherwise by consolidated Louisville/Jefferson County.

Demographics

As of the census of 2000, there were 247 people, 111 households, and 75 families living in the city. The racial makeup of the city was 98.79% White, 0.40% Native American, 0.40% Asian, and 0.40% from two or more races. Hispanic or Latino of any race were 1.21% of the population.

There were 111 households, out of which 25.2% had children under the age of 18 living with them, 58.6% were married couples living together, 8.1% had a female householder with no husband present, and 32.4% were non-families. 28.8% of all households were made up of individuals, and 15.3% had someone living alone who was 65 years of age or older. The average household size was 2.23 and the average family size was 2.72.

In the city, the population was spread out, with 18.6% under the age of 18, 4.5% from 18 to 24, 18.6% from 25 to 44, 28.7% from 45 to 64, and 29.6% who were 65 years of age or older. The median age was 49 years. For every 100 females, there were 80.3 males. For every 100 females age 18 and over, there were 73.3 males.

The median income for a household in the city was $61,250, and the median income for a family was $75,484. Males had a median income of $52,083 versus $37,143 for females. The per capita income for the city was $38,251. None of the families and 0.8% of the population were living below the poverty line, including no under eighteens and 2.7% of those over 64.

References

Cities in Jefferson County, Kentucky
Cities in Kentucky
Louisville metropolitan area